Rhaeto-Romance, Rheto-Romance, or Rhaetian, is a purported subfamily of the Romance languages that is spoken in south-eastern Switzerland and north-eastern Italy. The name "Rhaeto-Romance" refers to the former Roman province of Raetia. The question of whether these languages actually form a subfamily is called the Questione Ladina. The Italian linguist Graziadio Ascoli, writing in 1873, found them to share a number of intricacies and believed they formed a linguistic group.  The Rhaeto-Romance language differ from Italian in their evolution from Latin by having passed through a stage with phonemic vowel length, undergone certain consonant developments, and possibly developed a pair of central rounded vowels (now lost everywhere). If the subfamily is genuine, three languages would belong to it: Romansh in Switzerland, and Ladin and Friulian in Italy. Their combined number of speakers is about 660,000; the large majority of these (about 500,000) speak Friulian.

Origin 

Before the Roman conquest, the Alps were Celtic-speaking in the north and Rhaetian-speaking in the south. The area was incorporated into the Roman Empire during the reign of Augustus. The Rhaeto-Romance languages originated as a dialect of the provincial Latin of the central Alps.
 
By the end of the Roman Empire, there was an unbroken region of distinctive Romance speech here, which was gradually fragmented into secluded areas in the high valleys by the encroachment of German dialects from the north and of Gallo-Italic languages from the south.
 
Rhaeto-Romance was spoken over a much wider area during Charlemagne's rule, stretching north into the present-day cantons of Glarus and St. Gallen, to the Walensee in the northwest, and Rüthi and the Alpine Rhine Valley in the northeast. In the east, parts of modern-day Vorarlberg were Romance speaking, as were parts of Austrian Tyrol. The northern areas of what is currently Switzerland, called "Lower Raetia", became German-speaking by the 12th century; and by the 15th century, the Rhine Valley of St. Gallen and the areas around the Walensee were entirely German-speaking. 
 
This language shift was a long, drawn-out process, with larger, central towns adopting German first, while the more peripheral areas around them remained Romansh-speaking longer. The shift to German was caused in particular by the influence of the local German-speaking elites and by German-speaking immigrants from the north, with the lower and rural classes retaining Romansh longer.

Related languages 

The family is most closely related to its nearest neighbors: French, Franco-Provençal, Occitan, Venetian, Istriot and Lombard.
 
A number of lexical items are shared with Ibero-Romance due to the similar date of Latinization for both regions, although it can also be explained by means of Bartoli's areal linguistics theory, Ibero-Romance being a peripheral area, as are Balkano-Romance, Southern-Italian and Rhaeto-Romance, whereas Gallo-Romance and Italo-Romance are the central area. The Rhaeto-Romance languages were linked to other Romance languages that existed in bordering areas but have later disappeared, like the Moselle Romance and the Austrian Romance.

History and classification 

While the areas that now speak Friulian were originally inhabited by speakers of Venetic (likely Italic) and Celtic languages, the areas of Northeastern Italy that now speak Ladin initially spoke a non-Indo-European language called Raetic. Ladin and Romansh originate from the Vulgar Latin spoken by Roman soldiers during the conquests of Raetia.

Romansh 
By the mid-9th century, Romansh was spoken over a far wider area. However, with the migration of many German elite land owners, Romansh dissipated across Northern Italy.  The oldest literary text in the Romansh language is the Chianzun dalla guerra dagl Chiaste da Müs, which details the Musso War.

By 1803, the state of Grisons became a part of Switzerland, of whose population half spoke Romansh.  The strength of the central government of Grisons began to impose on the Romansh-speaking people, as the official language was German which resulted in many Romansh speakers to adopt German.  With the 20th century came a rise in tourism that took the focus away from the region's agricultural focus and German became the more practical language to learn.  Many in the intellectual class found this to be beneficial to the local population, as Romansh appeared to hinder their intellectual development as noted by Heinrich Bansi, a notable priest in 1897: "The biggest obstacle to the moral and economical improvement of these regions is the language of the people". This viewpoint was countered with the belief that the Romansh language was a hybrid of both Italian and German, allowing the Romansh speakers to have a moderate understanding of the other two more widely used languages.

By the mid 19th century, amidst a dwindling Romansh-speaking population a renaissance of sorts appeared.  This culminated in the 1885 creation of an association of all Romansh regions known as Società Retorumantscha.  Later, in 1919 the Lia Rumantscha was created to encompass all of the regional Romansh-speaking societies.  Additionally, more schools began to teach Romansh by the mid 19th century, and by 1860 Romansh became a subject in a teachers' college and an officially recognized language by 1880.

Despite these efforts, with more and more of the surrounding area speaking German, the Lia Rumantscha created Romansh-speaking daycare schools in the 1940s.  This effort failed to deliver, and the last school was closed by 1979.

Friulian 

Friulian traces its roots back to the Latin Aquileia.  Prior to Roman contact in 181 BC the region of northeastern Italy was of Raetian, Italic and Celtic origins and used a form of either Raetian, Venetic or Celtic.  The transition from Vulgar Latin to Friulian occurred in the 6th century CE .  The first official use of Friulian can be traced back to the 13th century and by the 15th century a majority of the population spoke the language, while the noble classes continued to use Latin or German.  In 1420 the area of Friuli transitioned under Venetian rule and Venetian dialect became the dominant language.  Over the years with the influence of Venetian and Italian becoming more abundant the Friulian language stagnated.  In the mid 20th century an earthquake struck that devastated the local region and many found solace in sharing the local language of Friulian.  While the teaching of Friulian in higher education is rapidly declining it still has its imprint on the local geography as many of the local towns and geographical landmarks (mountains, woods, animals, plants) were given Celtic names that survive to this day.

Ladin 

Ladin was initially a Vulgar Latin language from the Alps of northern Italy.  Beginning in the 6th century the Ladin language began to shrink due to the encroachment of Bavarian and Gallo-Italic languages, surviving in only the isolated mountainous areas.  In the early Middle Ages the Ladin region came under House of Habsburg and Republic of Venice rule.  From these two influences the Ladin area underwent the process of Germanisation.

By the end of World War I Italy had annexed the region that encompassed the Ladin language.  Along with the nationalism of the 20th century, Ladin was considered by many Italians to be an Italian dialect. Benito Mussolini would later push forward an Italianization of the region which further dwindled the Ladin language user base.  Despite the small amount of Ladin speakers, by 1972 the Italian government afforded Ladin the status of a secondary language.

Geographic distribution

Romansh 

Spoken in the Swiss canton of Graubünden by 60,561 people – 0.83% of the Swiss population – but this number is rapidly dropping.

Friulian 

Spoken in Italy, most notably the provinces of Udine and Pordenone, by about 600,000 people.

Ladin 
Spoken in northeastern Italy, in Trentino-Alto Adige and the Province of Belluno in Veneto, by about 41,000 people.

Official status

Romansh 
The first Swiss constitution of 1848 along with its revision of 1872 neglected to mention the Romansh language; however, it was translated into two Romansh dialects after the first revision.  In 1938 Romansh became a national language, though a delineation was made between "national" and "official" languages.  National languages were largely symbolic while official languages (French, German, and Italian) were used in an official capacity by the government.  One notable disadvantage of being a national, rather than official language was that parents would have to register their children's names under one of the official languages.

By 1996 Romansh was recognized as an official language beside French, German and Italian, and Rhaeto-Romansh is now the official correspondence used when communicating with Romansh people.

At this time the Canton of Grison is the only place where Romansh is the official language.  This allows for any citizen to request official documents from the local government in the Romansh language.

Friulian 
An official language of the autonomous region of Friuli, it has protected status, and is used in all forms of education in the region. Still used at popular levels for daily conversation.

Ladin 
Ladin is recognized by both provincial and national law in Italy.  In the early 1990s Italy signed European Charter for Regional or Minority Languages which is meant to protect and promote minority languages such as Ladin.

Dialects

Romansh 
 Sursilvan
 Putèr
 Vallader
 Surmiran
 Sutsilvan

Friulian 

 Central Friulian, spoken in the Udine province.
 Northern Friulian, spoken in Carnia.
 Southeastern Friulian, spoken in areas along the Isonzo river.
 Western Friulian, spoken in the Pordenone province.

Ladin 
 Athesian group of the Sella, spoken in South Tyrol.
 Trentinian group of the Sella, spoken in the Fassa Valley.
 Agordino group of the Sella, spoken most prominently Livinallongo del Col di Lana and Colle Santa Lucia.
 Ampezzan group, spoken in Cortina d'Ampezzo.
 Cadorino group, spoken in Cadore and Comelico.
 Nones and Solando group, spoken in In Western Trentino, in Non Valley, Val di Sole, Val di Peio, Val di Rabbi, and Val Rendena.

Varieties
 
The area where Rhaeto-Romance languages (also called Ladin languages in a wider sense, not to be confused with Ladino or Judaeo-Spanish) were spoken during the Middle Ages stretched from Switzerland to the Julian Alps (in modern-day western Slovenia).

The Rhaeto-Romance languages can be distinguished into the following varieties:

 Romansh: Switzerland. In Switzerland, Romansh is one of country's four national languages; however, its usage is rather limited to the canton of Graubünden. It is composed of the following dialects:
 Puter (Engadin valley)
 Vallader (Engadin valley)
 Surmiran
 Sursilvan
 Sutsilvan
 Rumantsch Grischun, the standardized literary language, constructed by the Swiss linguist Heinrich Schmid in 1982.
 Ladin: 
 Dolomitic Ladin in Italy (in Trentino, South Tyrol and the province of Belluno)
 Friulian: Friuli region, Italy

A phylogenetic classification using basic lexicon identifies a primary split between Romansh in Switzerland and Ladin in Italy. One secondary split distinguishes Engadinic from the other Romansh varieties in Switzerland. In Italy, another secondary split is evidently caused by the Dolomite mountain range that divides Ladin into a northern and a southern subbranch, with Friulian being grouped closest to the southern branch.

In this study, the divergence of the Rhaeto-Romance languages from their reconstructed lexical ancestor is about 7% on average. This would correspond to a time depth of about 500 years if the glottochronological replacement rate of 14% per millennium for Romance were trustworthy. However, the earliest available Romance text from the Alpine area is somewhat older and dates to AD 1200.

Phonology

Romansh 

The Romansh language has up to 26 consonant phonemes.  Word stress occurs either on the last or second to last syllable.

Friulian

Ladin

Grammar

Morphology

Romansh 

In Romansh word order directs the grammar rather than the noun being inflected.  Additionally, similar to most other Romance languages there are two genders in addition to s being used to indicate a plural word.

Friulian 

Similar to Italian and Spanish, most Friulian nouns end in a vowel based on the gender, with feminine nouns ending in e while masculine nouns end in i.

Syntax 
The general word order is subject-verb-object, however this can change at times where the verb can come before the subject.

Vocabulary

Romansh 

Many place names in Romansh date back before Roman contact stemming from Celtic origins.

Friulian 

Most words in Friulian are of the Romance variety due to its Latin roots; however, it still has many place names and flora that trace back to Celtic origins.

See also
Rhaetian language, an unrelated language spoken in ancient times around the area where Rhaeto-Romance is now spoken.
Western Romance languages

References